Mads Henriksen (born 29 October 1996) is a Danish cricketer. In April 2018, he was named in Denmark's squad for the 2018 ICC World Cricket League Division Four tournament in Malaysia. He played in Denmark's opening match of the tournament, against Bermuda.

In September 2018, he was the leading run-scorer for Denmark in Group A of the 2018–19 ICC World Twenty20 Europe Qualifier tournament, with 115 runs in five matches. Later the same month, he was named in Denmark's squad for the 2018 ICC World Cricket League Division Three tournament in Oman.

References

External links
 

1996 births
Living people
Danish cricketers
Place of birth missing (living people)